The Inline Downhill World Championships is the premier inline downhill championship organised by World Skate. The competition has been held annually since 2000 and has been part of World Skate's World Skate Games since 2017. World Skate has organized this championship in partnership with the International Inline Downhill Association (IIDA)

Venues

Elite Medallists

Men

Downhill race

Time trial

Women

Downhill race

Time trial

References

Recurring sporting events established in 2000
Inline downhill